The 1801 Vermont gubernatorial election for Governor of Vermont took place throughout September, and resulted in the re-election of Isaac Tichenor to a one-year term.

The Vermont General Assembly met in Newbury on October 8. The Vermont House of Representatives appointed a committee to examine the votes of the freemen of Vermont for governor, lieutenant governor, treasurer, and members of the governor's council.

The committee examined the votes, which showed that Isaac Tichenor was chosen for a fifth one-year term. In the election for lieutenant governor, the voters selected Paul Brigham for a sixth one-year term. Benjamin Swan was elected to a second one-year term as treasurer. Vote totals for the governor's race were not recorded, but one Vermont newspaper indicated that Tichenor had been reelected "by a large majority."

Results

References

Vermont gubernatorial elections
gubernatorial
Vermont